Lai Vung is a  township and capital of Lai Vung District, Đồng Tháp Province in the Mekong Delta region of Vietnam.

References

Populated places in Đồng Tháp province
District capitals in Vietnam
Townships in Vietnam